Yankee Dutch crossing is the name of a dance performed in a 4-by-4 square formation of 8 couples (16 dancers).  The original version, called simply Dutch Crossing, was choreographed in the English country dance style by Ernst van Brakel of the Netherlands in 1990.  In 2004, contra dance caller Joseph Pimentel modified the choreography in the American style, sometimes called Yankee Dutch crossing to distinguish it from the original. Any number of squares can perform the dance simultaneously. It is not normally found at monthly, bi-monthly or weekly dances. The most likely venues are multi-day dance weekends or weeks, where it is taught in sessions of one hour or longer.

Description

The square of 16 dancers comprises 4 pairs of couples, facing each other, in the corners of the square. These pairs of "neighbors" will remain together throughout the dance, except for temporary departures and returns... always to the original corner of the square. The dance has four major parts, which are all identical, except for the orientation of the paired couples, which changes by 90° from one part to the next. Each major part has two minor parts. In the first minor part, the four neighbors interact with either of the two adjacent corner foursomes, which alternates from one orientation to the next. In the second minor part, the diagonally opposite members of each foursome interact only with the similarly-positioned members of the other foursomes. Effectively, the square can be described as two "teams" of eight, doing very different things in the same shared space.  Each team also divides into 2 groups of four.  Four members of the "X team" traverse one of the diagonals of the square (from which the name Dutch Crossing derives), across and back. The other four members traverse the other diagonal.  The groups interact with each other in the middle and with members of the "O team" at the corners.  Simultaneously, eight members of the "O team" perform a grand right and left around the circumference of the square.  The role of each dancer alternates between "X team" and "O team" as the major parts cycle through the four orientations.  Understandably, it is not uncommon for a square to disintegrate before all four major parts are completed. But that is part of the dance's appeal.

See also 
 A step-by-step choreography can be found at 6+ Couple dances

Notes

References

External links 
 https://www.youtube.com/watch?v=0m8jPFEvteY
 https://www.youtube.com/watch?v=qiARGRpYnH8
 https://www.youtube.com/watch?v=RL1ulnHEuNY
 https://www.youtube.com/watch?v=v_ZljboRHbs

Country dance
Contra dance
Folk dance
Social dance